Tomi Jalo (22 October 1958 – 14 January 2009) was a Finnish footballer who played as a midfielder and spent his entire career with TPS. He competed in the men's tournament at the 1980 Summer Olympics.

His twin brother Timo is a former footballer for TPS.

References

External links
 

1958 births
2009 deaths
Footballers from Turku
Association football midfielders
Finnish footballers
Turun Palloseura footballers
Finland international footballers
Olympic footballers of Finland
Footballers at the 1980 Summer Olympics